Ropica tentata is a species of beetle in the family Cerambycidae. It was described by Francis Polkinghorne Pascoe in 1865.

The holotype was collected by Alfred Russel Wallace in Waigeo.

References

tentata
Beetles described in 1865